"Lilac" is a song by South Korean singer-songwriter IU. It was released on March 25, 2021, by Edam Entertainment through Kakao M as the second single from her fifth studio album of the same name. The song is an upbeat pop song with a nostalgic sound.

Composition and lyrics
"Lilac" is a pop song with a  thumping drumline and driving rhythm guitar. In the song IU recognizes that life does not always imitate art, which consoles us with its neat and memorable endings, and ties up its threads in a way that life rarely does.

Accolades

Charts

Weekly charts

Year-end charts

References

2021 singles
2021 songs
Gaon Digital Chart number-one singles
IU (singer) songs
Korean-language songs